A ship is a large vessel that floats on water, specifically the ocean and the sea.

Ship or ships may also refer to:

Transportation 
 Shipping, basic process of transporting goods and cargo
 Full-rigged ship, known as "ship" in the Age of Sail
 Spacecraft or spaceship, to travel in outer space
 Starship, spacecraft designed for interstellar travel
 Airship, powered lighter-than-air craft
 Landship, watercraft-style large terrestrial land vehicle

Arts, entertainment, and media

Fictional entities
 Ship (comics), the Marvel Comics AI used by Apocalypse, X-Factor, and Cable
 Ship, a Galvanic Mechomorph in Ben 10: Alien Force

Music
 Ships (album) by Danielson
 Ships (Irish band), an Irish band
 Ships (Japanese band), a Japanese boy band
 "Ship", a song by Level 42 on the album Retroglide
 "Ships" (song), 1979, by Ian Hunter

Other uses in arts, entertainment, and media
 Shipping (fandom), internet phenomenon of involvement with fictional romance
 The Ship (video game), a 2006 first-person shooter video game

SHIP
 INPP5D or SHIP1 (SH2-containing inositol phosphatase 1), an enzyme
 Phosphatidylinositol-3,4,5-trisphosphate 5-phosphatase, an enzyme
 Seed Herbarium Image Project
 Study of Health in Pomerania

Other uses
 Ship (St. Paul's Churchyard), a historical bookseller in London
 A Boy Scouts of America Sea Scout crew level
 Shippensburg University, Pennsylvania, nicknamed "Ship"
 Ships Coffee Shop, Los Angeles, California, US

See also
 Boat (disambiguation)
 The Ship (disambiguation)